Laitu (Laitu Chin) is a Kuki-Chin language of Burma. It is partially intelligible with Sumtu Chin. In Sittwe District, Rakhine State, Laitu is spoken in Minbya, Mrauk-U, and Myebon townships, and is also spoken in Paletwa township, Chin State.

Dialects
Ethnologue lists the following dialects of Laitu. Dialects differ by stream (creek).

Panmyaunggyi Stream (Kongtu)
Phuntha Stream (Daaitu)
Kanni Stream
Yaw Stream
Dalet Stream (Doitu, Ekai, Khulai)

References

Kuki-Chin languages